Palmcrantz is a Swedish noble family. Notable people with the surname include:

 Gert Palmcrantz (born 1938), Swedish sound engineer
 Helge Palmcrantz (1842–1880), Swedish inventor and industrialist

Swedish-language surnames
Swedish noble families